Microsciurus or dwarf squirrels is a genus of squirrels from the tropical regions of Central and South America.

Taxonomy and systematics
Recent DNA analysis has shown that there is some confusion regarding the traditional classification of the species in the genus Microsciurus, and that the genus may be polyphyletic. Currently, there are four species recognized:

Central American dwarf squirrel (Microsciurus alfari) Allen, 1895, Costa Rica, Nicaragua, Panama, northern Colombia
Amazon dwarf squirrel (Microsciurus flaviventer) Gray, 1867, western Amazon basin
Western dwarf squirrel (Microsciurus mimulus) Thomas, 1898, Ecuador, Colombia, Panama
Santander dwarf squirrel (Microsciurus santanderensis) Hernández-Camacho, 1957, central Colombia

A 2020 paper published on the taxonomy of Sciurinae split Microsciurus into three genera, one currently unnamed. The paper included genetic sampling from all species except Santander dwarf squirrel and (Microsciurus) simonsi. It suggests several new species, not all described.
Microsciurus
Central American dwarf squirrel, M. alfari
Microsciurus "species 1" from Colombia
Leptosciurus
Western dwarf squirrel, L. mimulus
Andean squirrel, L. pucheranii (moved from Sciurus)
Leptosciurus similis
Leptosciurus otinus
Leptosciurnus boquetensis
Leptosciurus isthmius
"Microsciurus"
Amazon dwarf squirrel, "M." flaviventer
"Microsciurus" sabanillae
"Microsciurus" "species 2" from Peru and Brazil (previously assigned to Syntheosciurus)

Description
However, the Neotropical pygmy squirrel, not in this genus, is much smaller than these species, as are certain squirrels in Africa and Asia. Microsciurus species have gray or brown backs, and white bellies.

Distribution and habitat
All dwarf squirrels in this genus live in tropical rain forests. Estimates of their abundance are limited. The IUCN lists the conservation status as "Least Concern" for three of the species and "Data Deficient" for Microsciurus santanderensis.

References

Bibliography
 Ronald M. Nowak: Walker's Mammals of the World. Johns Hopkins University Press, 1999 

 
Rodent genera
Rodents of Central America
Mammals of South America
Taxa named by Joel Asaph Allen